Stefanie Tschegg (born 7 July 1943 in Graz) is an emeritus at the University of Natural Resources and Life Sciences, Vienna.

Life 
Tschegg received her doctoral degree from the University of Vienna in 1971. From 1980 to 1981, she was a visiting associate professor at Massachusetts Institute of Technology. She finished her habilitation in physics in 1982. In 1989, she became a professor of physics at the University of Natural Resources and Life Sciences, Vienna.

Research 
Some of her research interests are:

 Structure, mechanical and fracture mechanical properties of different materials
 Development and application of material testing methods (especially methods based on ultrasonic)

Selected publications 
Three of her most-cited publications:

Awards 

 1977 Theodor Körner Award
 1983 Kardinal Innitzer Award
 2006 Tammann Commemorative Medal of DGM (German Association of Material Scientists)
 2011 Honorary Member of German Association for Materials Science and Testing (DVM)

References 

1943 births
Living people
Austrian women physicists
20th-century Austrian physicists
20th-century Austrian  women scientists
21st-century Austrian  physicists
21st-century Austrian  women scientists
University of Vienna alumni
Massachusetts Institute of Technology faculty
University of Natural Resources and Life Sciences, Vienna